The Second Battle of Saorgio was fought from 24 to 28 April 1794 between a French First Republic army commanded by Pierre Jadart Dumerbion and the armies of the Kingdom of Sardinia-Piedmont and the Habsburg monarchy led by Joseph Nikolaus De Vins. It was part of a successful French offensive designed to capture strategic positions in the Maritime Alps and Ligurian Alps, and on the Mediterranean coast. Tactical control of the battle was exercised by André Masséna for the French and Michelangelo Alessandro Colli-Marchi for the Coalition. At the time of the battle, the town was named Saorgio and belonged to Piedmont.

Since September 1792, the Piedmontese defenses around Saorge had resisted capture. In early April 1794, the French struck northeastward along the Italian Riviera, quickly seizing the small port of Oneglia. From there, Masséna struck north to capture two towns in the upper Tanaro valley before turning west to outflank the positions around Saorge. After some fighting, the Austro-Piedmontese withdrew to the north side of the Col de Tende (Tenda Pass) which the French occupied. Dumerbion's troops also seized a large portion of the Italian Riviera. The action occurred during the War of the First Coalition, part of the French Revolutionary Wars. The engagement is significant in military history because a newly appointed artillery general by the name of Napoleon Bonaparte drew up the plans for the offensive.

Background
The Kingdom of Sardinia-Piedmont stood at a disadvantage in a war with France because two of its territories lay on the French side of the Alps. These lands were the County of Nice on the Mediterranean coast and the Duchy of Savoy in the north. Aware of his awkward situation, King Victor Amadeus III of Sardinia attempted to secure an alliance with Habsburg Austria at the same time as he held diplomatic talks with the French. In spring 1792, war broke out between the French First Republic and Sardinia. The French government ordered General Anne-Pierre, marquis de Montesquiou-Fézensac to invade Savoy on 15 May, but that officer decided that he needed more time to prepare. During the summer, King Victor Amadeus frantically haggled with Austria to get military assistance. On 22 September, Austria finally agreed to provide an Auxiliary Corps of 8,000 troops under Feldmarschallleutnant Leopoldo Lorenzo Count of Strassoldo. However, the Convention of Milan came too late.

On 21 September 1792, Montesquiou invaded Savoy and resistance collapsed. The general reported to his government that the people welcomed his army. The town of Chambéry was occupied on 24 September. Sardinian General Lazary, a 70-year-old relic, proved unable to mount an effective defense. A second French force captured Nice without bloodshed on 27 September and went on to seize Villefranche-sur-Mer two days later. At the behest of its leaders, Savoy was incorporated into France on 27 November. On 23 September, a French naval squadron under Rear Admiral Laurent Jean François Truguet sailed to the Piedmontese port of Oneglia where an 800-man battalion disembarked. The troops sacked the town and murdered some monks before taking to their ships again. On 18 November 1792, the Sardinians repulsed their adversaries at Sospel (Sospello). The French retreated to L'Escarène and went into winter quarters.

Dismayed by the incapacity of his generals, King Victor Amadeus III of Sardinia begged the Austrians to send a commander to direct the combined Austrian and Piedmontese armies. The Austrian government appointed Feldzeugmeister Joseph Nikolaus De Vins to fill the post on 21 December 1792. Even so, Austria was aware that the French were trying to negotiate a peace with the Sardinians, and the Austrians did not fully trust their ally. The execution of King Louis XVI of France on 21 January 1793 appalled the other crowned heads of Europe and further isolated France.

On 28 February 1793, 12,000 French troops under Lieutenant General Armand Louis de Gontaut, Duke of Biron battled with 7,000 Sardinian soldiers under Charles-François Thaon, Count of Saint-André at Levens. In this French success, each side lost 800 casualties. In addition, the French captured two of their enemy's six cannons. The Sardinian army held a powerful defensive position at Saorge (Saorgio), blocking access to the strategically important Col de Tende (Tenda Pass). On 8 June 1793, the Army of Italy under General of Division Gaspard Jean-Baptiste Brunet won a minor victory over the Sardinians in the area of L'Aution Peak west of Saorge. The forces clashed again in the First Battle of Saorgio on 12 June. This time the French were defeated. The Sardinian units involved in these fights were two battalions each of the Cacciatori and Swiss Christ Infantry Regiments, one battalion each of the Saluzzo, Sardinia, and Lombardy Infantry Regiments. Also engaged were two companies of French volunteers, the Cacciatori de Canale, Light Infantry, 1st, 3rd, and 5th Grenadier Battalions, and the Vercelli, Casale, and Acqui Provincial Regiments. The attack was "ill-conceived" and ended in "disaster".

The allies tried to mount a counteroffensive, but this effort was crippled by the new commander's slowness. De Vins planned to recapture both Savoy and Nice, which a number of officers objected to. Because he suffered badly from gout, De Vins planned to control both offensives from the capital of Turin. The Duke of Montferrat, who led the counter-invasion of Savoy, was to follow strict daily orders from De Vins. Since Turin was  distant, the arrangements were impractical. In the event, a French force under General of Division François Christophe de Kellermann repulsed Lieutenant General Cordon's Savoy column at the Battle of Epierre on 15 September 1793. The French suffered 500 casualties out of 8,000 troops, while the Sardinians lost 1,000 men out of 6,000 engaged.

The Count of Saint-André was directed to advance on Nice from Saorgio. This effort was made difficult by tension between Saint-André and his Austrian subordinate Feldmarschallleutnant Michelangelo Alessandro Colli-Marchi. Meanwhile, De Vins' chief of staff, Eugène-Guillaume Argenteau managed to get himself on bad terms with most of the Piedmontese officer corps. At this time, portions of southern France rebelled against the revolutionary government. Large French republican forces had to be sent to suppress the revolt at the Siege of Toulon, giving Piedmont a chance to recover its lost territory. King Victor Amadeus and De Vins left the capital in August to oversee the southern front where they planned to start operations on 7 September. On 18 October, six Piedmontese battalions of the Aosta, Guardia, and Piedmont Infantry Regiments defeated the French at Gilette. Three days later there was an inconclusive skirmish at Utelle involving the 5th Grenadiers. The offensive ended when heavy snow fell in the mountains, forcing the king to give up the campaign and return to his capital in November.

Battle

At the start of 1794, the Piedmontese occupied a formidable defensive position that ran from Roquebillière on the west through the Col de Raus, L'Aution Peak, and Colle Basse to Saorge. From Saorge, the line ran northeast to Cima di Marte, Col Argente, and Monte Saccarello. The line was so strong that an outflanking move to the east seemed the obvious move. Sardinian General Dellera feared that the French might seize the Colle di Nava northwest of Oneglia. He wanted to occupy Briga Alta northeast of Saorgio but De Vins refused to authorize it. However, Dellera convinced the army commander to move an Austrian force from the Po River valley to Dego. In addition, De Vins ordered 4,000 Sardinian troops to protect the area around Oneglia.

French General Pierre Jadart Dumerbion commanded the Army of Italy. Competent but old, he had seen too many generals sent to the guillotine for failing or for having the wrong political views. Two of his predecessors suffered this fate, Brunet on 15 November 1793 and Biron on 31 December 1793. In order to stay out of trouble, Dumerbion determined to consult the all-powerful Representatives on mission before acting. At this time, the representatives were Augustin Robespierre and Antoine Christophe Saliceti and both were influenced by freshly-promoted General of Brigade Napoleon Bonaparte, the army's new artillery chief. Bonaparte drew up a strategic plan and Dumerbion listened. Bonaparte planned to launch a drive northeast along the coast to capture Oneglia, a nest of Sardinian privateers that preyed on the Genoa-to-Nice grain trade. From Oneglia, the French would turn north to seize Ormea, outflanking the enemy's defenses from the east. While these moves were implemented, the main army would distract the Coalition defenders by advancing directly on Saorge. Of Dumerbion's 43,000-man field army, 20,000 men formed the attacking force, divided into three columns and a reserve.

On 6 April 1794, Dumerbion opened the offensive. Crossing neutral territory belonging to the Republic of Genoa, the French seized the port of Oneglia on the 9th. Argenteau, who commanded the local Piedmontese division, occupied Ormea and strung out his 10 battalions in an attempt to link the Saorge defenses in the west with Dego in the east. The French advance, led by General of Division André Masséna, brushed aside Argenteau's men and captured Ormea around 17 April and Garessio on the 19th. Colli, the newly appointed commander at Saorge, now found that his position was outflanked. De Vins advised Colli to hold the position but to send back any forces not needed for immediate defense. Relations between the allies were so bad at this time that some Piedmontese officers believed that De Vins was plotting to betray them. On the French side, Auguste Marmont claimed that the ailing Dumerbion stayed in Nice during the entire operation.

On 24 April there was a clash at Saorge, as the French main army advanced north. Colli's defenders included three battalions of the Alvinczi Infantry Regiment Nr. 19, the 3rd Battalion of the Strassoldo Infantry Regiment Nr. 27, the 1st and 2nd Battalions of the Archduke Anton Infantry Regiment Nr. 52, and the 2nd and 9th Battalions of the Karlstadt Grenz infantry regiment. On the same day, Masséna successfully attacked the Col Argente with General of Brigade Amédée Emmanuel François Laharpe's division. On 27 April, the French seized La Brigue, inflicting heavy losses on the Sardinians. These belonged to the Cacciatori, Guardia, and Tortona Infantry Regiments, the 1st Grenadier Battalion, two companies of French volunteers, and the Cacciatori di Pandini company.

Results
The French seized Saorgio on 28 April after Colli withdrew. He abandoned the Col de Tende and retreated to Limone Piemonte, just north of the pass. In early May, Colli fell back to Borgo San Dalmazzo near the fortress of Cuneo. On the coast, the French advanced to seize Albenga and Loano. General of Division François Macquard occupied the Col de Tende, while farther east Masséna deployed his troops to hold the ridges between Ormea and Loano. In the fighting near Saorge, historian Digby Smith stated French losses as 1,500 killed and wounded, while the allied casualties numbered 2,800. Losses for the other battles are not given.

Bonaparte and the representatives on mission proposed a new operation to exploit the victory, but it was vetoed by Lazare Carnot. The defeat shocked the Austrians and Sardinians into signing a treaty on 29 May. The Sardinians promised to hold the Alpine passes while the Austrians pledged to defend the coast. The next action in the area was the First Battle of Dego on 21 September 1794.

Notes

References
 Boycott-Brown, Martin. The Road to Rivoli. London: Cassell & Co., 2001. 
 Broughton, Tony. napoleon-series.org Generals Who Served in the French Army during the Period 1789-1815
 Chandler, David G. The Campaigns of Napoleon. New York: Macmillan, 1966.
 Durant, Will and Durant, Ariel. The Age of Napoleon: A History of European Civilization from 1789 to 1815. NY: MJF Books, 1975. 
 Smith, Digby. The Napoleonic Wars Data Book. London: Greenhill, 1998. 

Battles involving Austria
Battles involving France
Battles involving Italy
Battles involving the Kingdom of Sardinia
Battles of the French Revolutionary Wars
Battles of the War of the First Coalition
Battles in Provence-Alpes-Côte d'Azur
Conflicts in 1794
1794 in France